Sufi Baleh (also Romanized as Şūfī Baleh and Şūfī Beleh; also known as Baleh, Şūfī, and Sūfi Bileh) is a village in Gol-e Cheydar Rural District, Sarshiv District, Marivan County, Kurdistan Province, Iran. At the 2006 census, its population was 270, in 49 families. The village is populated by Kurds.

References 

Towns and villages in Marivan County
Kurdish settlements in Kurdistan Province